ROKS Gwanggaeto the Great (DDH-971) is the lead ship of the Gwanggaeto the Great-class in the Republic of Korea Navy. She is named after Gwanggaeto the Great.

Development 
The KDX-I was designed to replace the old destroyers in the ROKN that were transferred from the US Navy in the 1950s and 1960s. It was thought to be a major turning point for the ROKN in that the launching of the first KDX-I meant that ROKN finally had a capability to project power far from its shores. After the launching of the ship, there was a massive boom in South Korean international participation against piracy and military operations other than war.

Construction and career 
ROKS Gwanggaeto the Great was launched on 28 October 1996 by Daewoo Shipbuilding and commissioned on 24 July 1998.

Gallery

References

Gwanggaeto the Great-class destroyers
1996 ships
Ships built by Daewoo Shipbuilding & Marine Engineering